Gary Nova (born April 27, 1993) is an American football quarterback. He played college football at Rutgers and was the Scarlet Knights starting quarterback from 2012 to 2014.

Early life
Nova attended Don Bosco Prep High School in Ramsey, New Jersey.

College career
Nova started five games in 2011 as a true freshman and led Rutgers to a victory in the 2011 Pinstripe Bowl. In 2012, Nova was named the starting quarterback and led Rutgers to its best start since 2006. The 2013 season proved less successful for Nova, as he was replaced by Chas Dodd in the final two games, as the starting quarterback. Nova regained the starting job for the 2014 season. On September 27, 2014 Nova set the Rutgers record for career touchdown passes. In the 2014 Quick Lane Bowl he went 9-of-20 and threw for 184 yards with 2 touchdowns. He was named team MVP at the 2014 awards banquet.

Statistics
Nova's career statistics are as follows:

References

1993 births
Living people
People from Elmwood Park, New Jersey
Players of American football from New Jersey
Don Bosco Preparatory High School alumni
American football quarterbacks
Rutgers Scarlet Knights football players